Yaadon Ki Baaraat is a 1973 Indian Hindi-language masala film, directed by Nasir Hussain and written by Salim–Javed (Salim Khan and Javed Akhtar). It featured an ensemble cast, starring Dharmendra, Vijay Arora, Tariq, Zeenat Aman, Neetu Singh and Ajit.

The film was influential in the history of Indian cinema. It has been widely identified as the first masala film, combining elements of the action, drama, romance, musical, crime and thriller genres. The masala went on to become the most popular genre of Indian cinema, and Yaadon Ki Baaraat has thus been identified as "the first" quintessentially "Bollywood film." It also launched the careers of several actors, as the commercial breakthrough Hindi film for Zeenat Aman and Neetu Singh, who became leading actresses of the 1970s, and as the debut film for Nasir Hussain's nephews Tariq Khan and Aamir Khan, the latter a child actor who grew up to be one of the biggest movie stars in Hindi cinema.

It is still remembered fondly for its Hindi soundtrack, composed by music director R.D. Burman. The film was later remade in Tamil as Naalai Namadhe, in Telugu as Annadammula Anubandham, and in Malayalam as Himam.

Plot 
The film starts with three young brothers, Shankar, Vijay and, Ratan, celebrating their father's birthday with their mother and their domestic helper. Their mother sings Yaadon ki baarat song, which she sings every year and which the boys love. Later, their father goes out. However, on the way he witnesses a theft done by Shakal and his henchmen.

Shakal realises that he will be in danger if the father reports it to the police and decides to kill him before any further action. Later, Shakal and his henchmen break into their house and shoots the father. The mother, hearing all the commotion goes to check only to find her husband dead. Shakal shoots her too. The incident is witnessed by Shankar and Vijay and they flee. They reach a railway station where Shankar manages to catch a train. He tries to take Vijay with him but unfortunately they separate. With nowhere to go, Shankar spends time in begging. He meets Usman another boy like him who spends time in stealing food from shops for quenching his hunger.

The maid approaches the police station who file a missing case for Vijay and Shankar. With the police's advice the maid decides to adopt Ratan. Vijay was found unconscious by a groundkeeper of a mansion owned by a wealthy man. The groundkeeper adopts him.

15 years later
The brothers have grown up into mature adults. Shankar, the eldest is now joined by Usman on a crime spree around the city. However, he is still haunted by the murder of his parents and vows to kill the culprit and find his brothers. Vijay, the second, is now an unemployed and charming youth. Ratan, the youngest, lives with the maid and has now started a band in heavens hotel and does gigs to make a living.

Vijay meets Sunita and flirts with her though Sunita shows dislike towards Vijay. Later, Vijay returns home and finds Sunita there. As later, it's revealed that Sunita is the daughter of the wealthy man. A party is organised by Sunita in the mansion. Where, she sings 'Chura Liya Hai'. Vijay falls in love with her. Sunita who knew this, acts as if she too fell in love. Later, she publicly mocks him.

Vijay feigns as if he is sick, Sunita who gets to know of this feels pity for him. Vijay and his friend, Salim does a drama to make Sunita fall for him. They act as if Vijay is suffering with Cancer and may die soon. Sunita decides to make him happy and goes to a trip with him. However, she falls in love with Vijay. Later, Vijay reveals to Sunita that he has no cancer. Sunita is enraged at first, but forgives Vijay. Ratan falls in love with his co-dancer and singer.

Meanwhile, the brothers meet several times, however, they never know that they are brothers. In a concert, Ratan sings 'Yaadon ki Baarat' to find his brothers. Vijay and Shankar who were present there are overjoyed and Vijay sings along with him. Vijay and Ratan unite. Shankar writes to Ratan asking him to meet him but is unable to because of his boss who is none other than Shakal. Shankar discovers that Shakal is his parents' murderer.

Shakal decides to flee to another country. Shankar finds about this, he joins hands with his brothers and Sunita to defeat Shakal forever. Shakal realises that Shankar has discovered his parents' murderer. He and his son Rupesh tries to run away from Shankar but he corners them. Finally, Shakal and Rupesh tries to escape through the railway tracks. During this, Shakal's leg is stuck in the railway tracks. Shankar takes this opportunity to kill Shakal but before he can kill him, Shankar sees a train coming and leaves Shakal to die, while restraining Rupesh. Shakal gets killed by the coming train. In the end, Shankar unites with his brothers.

Cast 

 Dharmendra as Shankar
 Zeenat Aman as Sunita
 Vijay Arora as Vijay
 Tariq Khan as Ratan/Monto
 Neetu Singh as Dancer
 Aamir Khan as Young Ratan
 Ajit Khan as Shakaal
 Anamika as Jack's Daughter
 Ashoo as Mother of Shankar, Vijay, Ratan
 Nasir Khan as Father of Shankar, Vijay, Ratan
 Satyen Kappu as Jack
 Jalal Agha as Salim
 Imtiaz Khan as Roopesh
 Master Ravi as Young Vijay
 Master Rajesh as Young Shankar
 Anamika as Jack's Daughter
 Ram Avtar as Businessman
 Moolchand as Businessman
 Jagdish Raj

Production 
Nasir Hussain's nephew Aamir Khan, who went on to become one of the most successful actors in Bollywood, made his acting debut as child artist at the age of eight with this film, appearing in the title song.

Soundtrack 

The music and soundtrack of the film was by R. D. Burman, with lyrics by Majrooh Sultanpuri. The opening lines of the hit song, "Chura Liya Hai Tumne" were inspired from the English song, "If It's Tuesday, This Must Be Belgium" by Bojoura from the soundtrack of 1969 film of the same name. Apart from the Serial title song Pandya Store "Yaadon Ki Baaraat Nikli Hai" that appears multiple times in the film, the other best remembered numbers are "Lekar Hum Deewana Dil", partly for the picturisation on the pin-up girl Neetu Singh, and Kishore Kumar and Asha Bhosle's duet, "Meri Soni Meri Tamanna". Child singers Padmini Kolhapure later became a noted actress, while Sushma Shrestha, also known as Poornima, became a successful playback singer.

Reception

Box office 
The film became a box office blockbuster. It was 2nd highest grossing film of 1973.highest-grossing films in India, grossing 5.5 crore. This was equivalent to $7.1 million in 1973, and is equivalent to US$ million or 255 crore in 2016.

Awards 
21st Filmfare Awards:
Nominated

 Best Actor – Dharmendra
Best Music Director – R. D. Burman

Impact 
The film popularized the now familiar Bollywood theme of separated siblings united by fate.

Notes

References

External links 
 

1973 films
Films scored by R. D. Burman
1970s Hindi-language films
Hindi films remade in other languages
Films directed by Nasir Hussain
Films set in hotels
Films with screenplays by Salim–Javed
1970s Urdu-language films
Urdu films remade in other languages
1970s masala films
Urdu-language Indian films